Erard of Brienne may refer to:
Erard I of Brienne (c. 1090 – c. 1120?), count of Brienne
Erard II of Brienne (died 1191), count of Brienne and grandson of the above
Erard of Brienne-Ramerupt (c. 1170 – 1246), nephew of the above; frequently referred to himself as "Erard of Brienne" in his letters